The Stånga Games (in Swedish Stångaspelen), also referred to as the "Gotland Olympic Games", is an annual sports competition in Stånga on the Swedish island of Gotland. The first Stånga Games were concluded on 27 July 1924. The games are held during five days around the second weekend in July and gathers about 2000 participants. Competitions are held in various Gutnish disciplines, some dating back to the Viking Age.

History
The first competition was held in 1882. From the late 1880s, general Gotland athletics competitions were held several times per decade. In 1912, a special association was formed - "Föreningen Gotländsk Idrott" (FGI)  with the mission of promoting the Gotland sports games. In 1924, FGI decided to arrange a Gothic sport competition in Stånga. Reinhold Dahlgren (1886-1968), a high school teacher from Östergarn organized the competition annually starting  1933 calling it officially Stångaspelen. The Stånga municipality gave the games a central location in Stånga with the new Stangmalmen racing stadium ready for competition in 1956.

When Reinhold Dahlgren retired at the age of 75, his sons Tore Dahlgren (1914-1973) and Anders Dahlgren (1924-1997) took over the responsibility of organizing the games.

Sports 
Varpa
Pärk
Caber toss
Gutnish pentathlon
Pillow fight on a pole (Herre på stång)
Leg hook (Rövkrok)
Hobble kick (Sparka Bleistre)
Tug of war, eight-man teams (Dragkamp)
Two-men tug of war, facing (Att dra hank)
Two-men tug of war, back to back (Att täme stäut)

MVPs

Year, Team, Player
1924 När I - Valfred Nilsson
1925 Hablingbo BK - Karl Hansson
1926 Slite IF - Brynolf Wahlén
1927 När IF - Valfred Nilsson
1928 När - Valfred Nilsson
1929 Lau - John Larsson
1930 Stånga IF - Erik Lundgren
1931 Lau - John Larsson
1932 Burs IF - Gottfrid Nilsson
1933 Lau I - John Larsson
1934 Burs IF - Gottfrid Nilsson
1935 Stånga - Erik Lundgren
1936 Burs - Gottfrid Nilsson
1937 Burs - Fritz Pettersson
1938 Gothem - Johannes Arweson
1939 När II - Hugo Gardell
1940 No games held
1941 När II - Hugo Gardell
1942 När II - Hugo Gardell
1943 Hablingbo - Manne Boberg
1944 Hablingbo - Manne Boberg
1945 När I - Ivar Häglund
1946 När I - Ivar Häglund
1947 När - Ture Häglund
1948 Burs - Albert Alvengren
1949 Burs - Albert Alvengren
1950 Gothem - Henning Gahnström
1951 Gothem - Henning Gahnström
1952 Silte - Erik Hedin
1953 När - Bertil Schüberg

1954 Silte - Erik Hedin
1955 No games held
1956 När - Allan Nilsson, Alvare
1957 När - Allan Nilsson, Alvare
1958 När II - Arne Ohlsson
1959 När - Allan Nilsson, Alvare
1960 Lau I - Allan Larsson
1961 Lau I - Allan Larsson
1962 Lau I - Allan Larsson
1963 När - Allan Nilsson, Alvare
1964 När - Allan Nilsson, Alvare
1965 När - Allan Nilsson, Alvare
1966 När - Allan Nilsson, Alvare
1967 När - Allan Nilsson, Alvare
1968 Lau I - Allan Larsson
1969 Lau I - Allan Larsson
1970 När - Allan Nilsson, Alvare
1971 När II - Bengt-Rune Nilsson
1972 Lau I - Allan Larsson
1973 Silte - Erik Hedin
1974 När - Allan Nilsson, Alvare
1975 När - Allan Nilsson, Alvare
1976 När II - Bengt-Rune Nilsson
1977 Vallstena I - Rune Larsson
1978 Vallstena I - Rune Larsson
1979 Lau III - Torgny Larsson
1980 Lau III - Torgny Larsson
1981 Lau III - Torgny Larsson
1982 När IV - Torsten Smitterberg
1983 Lau III - Torgny Larsson
1984 Lau III - Torgny Larsson

1985 Lau III - Torgny Larsson
1986 Lau III - Torgny Larsson
1987 Lau III - Torgny Larsson
1988 Gothem II - Michael Olofsson
1989 Lau III - Torgny Larsson
1990 När III - Jaan Nilsson
1991 Gothem II - Michael Olofsson
1992 Gothem II - Michael Olofsson
1993 Stånga IV - Björn Ekman
1994 Stånga IV - Björn Ekman
1995 När III - Jaan Nilsson
1996 Stånga IV - Björn Ekman 
1997 Hablingbo II - Johan Mattsson
1998 Hablingbo II - Johan Mattsson
1999 Hablingbo II - Johan Mattsson
2000 När III - Jaan Nilsson
2001 Hablingbo II - Johan Mattsson
2002 Hablingbo II - Johan Mattsson
2003 Hablingbo II - Johan Mattsson
2004 Hablingbo II - Johan Mattsson
2005 Hablingbo II - Johan Mattsson
2006 Hablingbo II - Johan Mattsson
2007 Hablingbo II - Johan Mattsson
2008 Hablingbo II - Johan Mattsson
2009 Hablingbo II - Johan Mattsson
2010 Hablingbo II - Johan Mattsson
2011 Hablingbo II - Johan Mattsson
2012 Lau I - Arvid Larsson
2013 Lau I - Arvid Larsson
2014 Lau I - Arvid Larsson
2015 Lau I - Arvid Larsson
2016 Lau I - Arvid Larsson
2017 Lau I - Arvid Larsson

Bibliography
Mattsson, Anders (1999). Stångaspelen 75 år Visby: Fören. Gutnisk idrott.

References

Recurring sporting events established in 1924